"Sexodus" is a song by English rapper M.I.A. from her fourth studio album, Matangi (2013). It is written by M.I.A. alongside British record producer Switch, Doc McKinney, Illangelo, and The Weeknd are also credited due to a sample of The Weeknd's song "Lonely Star" from his mixtape Thursday. The album version of the song was noted for its "striking" similarities to a different song from the album, "Exodus". However, the single version features War Syntaire and was labelled as being "Re-Loaded With War". Before the track was recorded by M.I.A., she offered the song to Madonna.

The song was originally titled "This Exodus", before the "Thi" was deleted and M.I.A. kept the typo. M.I.A. performed the song live during her 2013–14 Matangi Tour.

Track listing
Digital download
 "M.I.A.'s Sexodus Re-Loaded With War"  – 4:54

Personnel
Credits adapted from the liner notes of Matangi.

 M.I.A. – vocals
 Hit-Boy – production
 War Syntaire – production, guitar
 Haze Banga – engineering; co-production; mixing
 Geoff Pesche – mastering

Release history

References

2013 songs
2015 singles
British contemporary R&B songs
Interscope Records singles
M.I.A. (rapper) songs
Song recordings produced by Hit-Boy
Songs written by M.I.A. (rapper)
Songs written by Doc McKinney
Songs written by Illangelo
Songs written by Switch (songwriter)
Songs written by the Weeknd